Kirkcaldy & Dysart Football Club are a Scottish football club based in Kirkcaldy, Fife. The club renamed from Kirkcaldy YM JFC after a merger with Dysart AFC in 2019.

Kirkcaldy YM were formed in 1969 as an amateur club, becoming members of the Scottish Junior Football Association in 1970. Their home ground is Alex Penman Park (previously known as Denfield Park) where they have been based since 1993, although previous grounds included a five-year spell in the village of Coaltown of Wemyss during the 1970s.

The SJFA restructured prior to the 2006–07 season, and Kirkcaldy found themselves in the twelve-team East Region, Central Division, finishing third in their first season in the division. However they pulled out of the 2007–08 campaign due to a shortage of players. A public meeting in February 2008 led to the formation of a new committee and the club re-joined the Central Division for the 2008–09 season.

YM gained promotion to the East Region Premier League for 2013–14, the second tier of the East Region, before immediately dropping back down to the North Division. They finished bottom of the South Division in 2016–17 and 2017–18, only managing to score a single point in the latter season.

The team have been managed since May 2018 by former player Craig Ness, his second spell in charge.

In 2019 Kirkcaldy YM merged with Dysart as part of the Kirkcaldy Community Football Partnership, which includes a football pathway along with Kirkcaldy FC and Templehall United.

In May 2020, the club confirmed they had successfully applied to join the East of Scotland Football League within the senior pyramid.

References

External links
 

Football clubs in Scotland
Scottish Junior Football Association clubs
Association football clubs established in 1969
Kirkcaldy
Football clubs in Fife
1969 establishments in Scotland
East of Scotland Football League teams
Sports clubs founded by the YMCA